Chicago Afrobeat Project (CAbP) is a seven- to 14-piece world music ensemble with influences including afrobeat, hip hop, funk, jazz, jùjú music, and rock. The members are well versed in afrobeat, the musical style of Fela Kuti and Tony Allen, and use it as a jumping off point to explore other styles. Based in Chicago, the band began in 2002 in a loft at 657 West Lake Street. The group is sometimes accompanied by African dancers from Chicago's Muntu Dance Theatre as well as Ayodele Drum & Dance. The group has released five studio efforts between 2005-2017, all recorded at Fullerton Recording Studios. In the summers of 2013 and 2014, the band collaborated with Fela Kuti's original drummer, Tony Allen, for a series of performances and recording sessions at Fullerton Recording Studios with the resulting work featured on the album What Goes Up (2017).

Members
 David Glines - Guitar
 Kevin Ford - Keyboards, Studio Shaman
 Garrick Smith  - Baritone Saxophone
 Angelo Garcia - Tenor Saxophone
 Ryan Tedder - Tenor Saxophone, Baritone Saxophone, Keyboards, Guitar
 Mark Thomson - Trombone
 Xavier Galdon - Trombone
 Parris Fleming - Trumpet
 Danjuma Gaskin - Percussion
 Luc Parcell - Bass 
 Chadwick - Painter (select shows)
 TJ Okulnola - Talking Drum (select shows)
 Tosha Alston - Dancer (select shows)
 Imania Detry - Dancer (select shows)

Awards
 2017 - Chicago Tribune (Greg Kot) Top 10 Chicago Indie Releases of 2017
 2017 - Winner, Best African Artist: Chicago Music Awards
 2014 - Best International/World Music Act: Chicago Reader's "Best of Chicago 2014
 2014 - Winner, Best African Entertainer: Chicago Music Awards
 2013 - Tied for Runner-Up, Best International/World Music Act: Chicago Reader's "Best of Chicago 2013"
 2013 - Rhapsody Music Top 25 World Music Albums (Nyash UP!)
 2012 - Winner, Best African Artist: Chicago Music Awards
 2011 - Winner, Best African Artist: Chicago Music Awards
 2010 - Winner, Best African Artist: Chicago Music Awards
 2009 - Winner, Best African Artist: Chicago Music Awards
 2008 - Winner, Best African Artist: Chicago Music Awards
 2006 - Nominated for Chicago Music Award's "Award of Honor for Contribution to World beat Music"
 2005 - Nominated Best African Artist: Chicago Music Awards
 2004 - Nominated Best African Artist: Chicago Music Awards

Selected festivals
 Hyde Park Jazz Festival (2017)
 Chicago World Music Festival (2003, 2006, 2013, 2015)
 Utah Arts Festival - Salt Lake City, UT (2008, 2012)
 CIMMfest (Chicago International Movies & Music Festival) - Chicago, IL (2016)
 Summerfest - Milwaukee, WI (2014, 2015)
 North Coast Music Festival Official After Party (with Tony Allen) - Chicago, IL (2014)
 Bear Creek Music Festival - Live Oak, FL (2008)
 High Sierra Music Festival (2007, 2008)
 Wakarusa Music Festival (2006, 2008)
 Detroit Concert of Colors - Detroit, MI (2014)
 Boogie on the Bricks - Athens, OH (2016)
 Evanston Ethnic Arts & Music Festival - Evanston, IL (2016)
 Celebrate Clark Street - Chicago, IL (2007, 2008, 2016)
 Green Eggs & Jam - Leavenworth, KS (2015)
 Merchant Street Music Festival - Kankakee, IL (2015)
 Logan Square Arts Festival - Chicago, IL (2015)
 Felabration - Denver, CO (2014)
 Deschutes Brewery Warehouse Party - Bend, OR (2014)
 Sweet Pea Festival - Bozeman, MT (2014)
 Ann Arbor Summer Festival - Ann Arbor, MI (2014)
 Arcadia Creek Festival Place - Kalamazoo, MI (2014)
 Reggae in the Mountains - Ketchum, ID (2013)
 Windy City Ribfest - Chicago, IL (2013)
 Artoberfest - Benton Harbor, MI (2013)
 Andersonville Midsommarfest - Chicago, IL (2012)
 Groovefest - Cedar City, UT (2012) 
 Dubuquefest - Dubuque, IA (2012)
 Starwood Festival (2011)
 Traverse City Summer Microbrew and Music Festival - Traverse City, MI (2010)
 Camp Euforia - Lone Tree, IA (2007, 2010, 2020)
 Mid Summer Meltdown Music Festival - Kempton, PA (2010)
 Truckee Reggae Fest - Truckee, CA (2009)
 Taste of Chicago - Chicago, IL (2009)
 Bele Chere Music Festival (2005, 2006) 
 Chicago's Summer Dance Series (2005, 2007, 2010)
 Summer Camp Festival (2005, 2007, 2008)
 Vassar College Jazz Festival (2005, 2006)

Guest musicians

Live
 Tony Allen - (2013, 2014, 2018)
 Sugar Blue - (2013)
 JC Brooks - (2013, 2017)
 Akenya - (2017)
 Kiara Lanier (2017)
 Ugochi (2008, 2011, 2017)
 Sahr from FELA! on Broadway - 2012
 Jeff Parker from Tortoise
 Howard Levy
 Bobby Broom
 Fareed Haque
 Paul Wertico
 Dave Watts from The Motet

Recordings
 Tony Allen (2017)
 Ugochi (2007,2009,2017)
 Bobby Broom (2007)
 Fareed Haque (2005)
 J.C. Brooks (2017)
 Akenya (2017)
 Isaiah Oby (2017)
 Òrànmíyàn (2017)
 Kiara Lanier (2017)
 Legit (2017)
 Rico Sisney from Sidewalk Chalk (2017)
 Maggie Vagle from Sidewalk Chalk (2017)
 Diverse (2005)
 Brother Mike (2005)

Discography

Albums
 What Goes Up - Independent (2017)
 Nyash UP! - CAbP Music (2013)
 (A) Move to Silent Unrest - CAbP Music (2007)
 Chicago Afrobeat Project - CAbP Music (2005)

EPs
 Off the Grid EP - CAbP Music (2009)

Compilations Featured
 Rough Guide to Afrobeat Revival (2009)

Notes

References
 CityBeat January 9, 2010
 The Urban Flux - "Chicago Afrobeat Project Brings Funk-Infused Dance to Le Poisson Rouge" February 9, 2011
 Recoil Magazine - interview with Nick Stephenson December 2007
 NUVO - "Chicago Afrobeat Project" by Paul F. P. Pogue

External links
 http://www.chicagoafrobeatproject.com

Jam bands
American world music groups
Afro-beat musical groups
American funk musical groups